Félix Léonnec was a French author and film director, born in 1872 in Brest. He wrote and directed films between 1916 and 1923. He was the brother of cartoonist and illustrator Georges Léonnec. His father was Paul Léonnec, a cartoonist.

Work
as writer
Rigadin avance l'heure (short) (as Félix Léonnec) (1916)
Rigadin professeur de danse (short) (as Félix Léonnec) (1916)
Sous les phares (1916)
L'amie d'enfance (1922)
Le taxi 313-X-7 (story) (1923)

as director
Madame Cicéron, avocate (short) (1917)
La trouvaille de Monsieur Sansonnet (short) (1918)
Tenebras (co-director) (1919)
Le trésor de Kériolet (1920)
L'amie d'enfance (1922)

References

Year of death missing
French directors
Writers from Brest, France
Film people from Brest, France
French male writers
1872 births